Caracladus is a genus of dwarf spiders that was first described by Eugène Louis Simon in 1884.

Species
 it contains five species:
Caracladus avicula (L. Koch, 1869) (type) – France, Switzerland, Germany, Austria, Italy
Caracladus leberti (Roewer, 1942) – Western, Central Europe
Caracladus montanus Sha & Zhu, 1994 – China
Caracladus tsurusakii Saito, 1988 – Japan
Caracladus zamoniensis Frick & Muff, 2009 – France, Switzerland, Austria

See also
 List of Linyphiidae species

References

Araneomorphae genera
Linyphiidae
Spiders of Asia